Immortal Soul is the fourteenth studio album by American heavy metal band Riot, released through Marquee/Avalon in Japan and Steamhammer Records in the rest of the world. It marked the short lived return of the Thundersteel touring line-up featuring vocalist Tony Moore, guitarists Mark Reale and Mike Flyntz, bassist Don Van Stavern, and drummer Bobby Jarzombek. It is the last Riot album to feature Moore, Jarzombek and long-time guitarist Mark Reale, who at the time was the only original member left in the band, before his death in January 2012.

After Reale's death, Van Stavern and Flyntz decided to carry on touring the world and releasing new studio material, under the name Riot V.

Track listing
All songs composed by Riot.

Personnel

Band members
 Tony Moore – lead vocals
 Mark Reale – guitar
 Mike Flyntz – guitar
 Don Van Stavern – bass
 Bobby Jarzombek – drums

Production
 Bruno Ravel – producer, engineer, mixing, mastering 
 Joe Floyd – engineer, mixing
 Paul Orofino – engineer

References

Riot V albums
2011 albums
SPV/Steamhammer albums